Rally Championship is a rally video game. It was released for PlayStation 2 on 31 May 2002 and GameCube on 7 February 2003. It is developed by Warthog Games and published by SCi. It is the last game in the Rally Championship series. The game is a sequel to the 2001 game Rally Championship Xtreme. It is the first game in the series not published by Europress and the first game not released on the PC.

There are 6 different locations (Wales, Scotland, Isle of Man, United States, the Arctic and Kenya), with 4 tracks for each location.

Reception

Rally Championship garnered generally average reviews, and holds an averages of 64% and 63/100 on aggregate websites GameRankings and Metacritic respectively. GameSpy summarized that "Rally Championship simply doesn't stack up against competition like Colin McRae, particularly in the graphics department. It's a great sport, with a lot of subtle and demanding facets, but this only glosses the surface".

References

External links

2002 video games
GameCube games
Multiplayer and single-player video games
Racing video games set in the United States
Rally racing video games
PlayStation 2 games
Video games developed in the United Kingdom
Video games set in the Arctic
Video games set in Kenya
Video games set in Scotland
Video games set in Wales
Conspiracy Entertainment games